The Highlander Challenge World Championships (or more simply the Highlander Challenge or Gododdin Highlander Challenge) is a tournament that marries traditional Highland Games with more contemporary strength athletics. It was created to help reinvigorate Highland Games in Scotland by giving a modern and aspirational image while maintaining the tradition inherent in the history of the sport.

History
Highland Games has a long and distinguished history in Scotland. It was once claimed to be the biggest spectator sport in the country after football and as a format has been exported around the globe. In particular, it has been very successful in North America. However, in its native land some well informed commentators began to note that it was attracting small crowds, the format was deemed tired and the number of traditional heavy competitors was dwindling at once well attended gatherings.

Dr Douglas Edmunds, the co-founder of the World's Strongest Man, but more pertinently a former world caber-tossing champion, determined to reinvigorate the sport in his native Scotland. Along with his son, Gregor Edmunds the 2007 winner of the World Highland Games Championships, he set about organizing a new competition that would attract some of the top names from the world from such disciplines as Highland Games, strength athletics, powerlifting and field athletics. He said "Gimmicky strength events, like truck-pulling, we feel are inappropriate when Scotland has such a magnificent history…Sadly, some games have poor quality athletes, bad equipment, and poor quality commentary with little crowd interaction. We aim to change that."

Thus was spawned the Highland Challenge. Invitees to the tournament had to meet high criteria, being either national champions, Olympians, world record-holders, World Highland games champions, World's Strongest Man finalists, and US highland games champions. Having brought the earth of their homelands to the Moot Hill, in the same manner and place as allegiance was sworn to Scotland's ancient kings, contestants would enter a competition consisting of a mixture of traditional Highland Games events and more contemporary strongman tests in order to vie for the title of the "Chieftain's Champion".

The 2007 event saw Sebastian Wenta win the competition and having sampled some success the next games were planned for 2008. Douglas Edmunds managed to attract a number of sponsors for the 2008 event, as well as gaining an agreement with Channel 4 to televise the event. The 2008 event took place at Scone on 19 and 20 July 2008. Such was its success that a 2009 event was planned for immediately.

Events
The events contested are designed to echo not only the traditions of the Highland Games but also the history of Scotland. They include wrestling, schiltron jousting and stone-lifting, as well as traditional throws, such as the caber. In addition, there are re-enactments of battles including in 2008 the 1396 Battle of the North Inch starring Hal o' the Wynd.

In the 2008 contest a new event called "The Whisky Plunder," (sponsored by The Famous Grouse) saw competitors racing with four casks. The Famous Grouse also sponsored the "Tossing the Caber" event, with winners toasting success with a Famous Grouse trophy and a personalised Gallon Bottle.

Past winners

2007: Gododdin Challenge

Final
The Highlander Challenge was to begin on 26 May 2007 at Blair Castle, Scotland. The Games made up two half-hour episodes of the IFSA Strongman 26 programme television series. The event was also backed by Event Scotland and was conceived by Dr. Douglas Edmunds. It went by the name "Gododdin Challenge" in 2007. Sebastian Wenta edged out Gregor Edmunds by one-half-point for the victory at the Gododdin Challenge at Blair Castle. Hjalti Arnason who watched the contest commented that this made for TV event would result in excellent shows and Mike Zolkiewicz, who finished fourth said that the blend of traditional Highland Games and strongman events "had great balance and it tested athletic ability beyond just a Highland Games or a strongman contest."

The final placings were:

2008 Event
The 2008 finals were on 19 and 20 July at Scone Palace They were televised by Channel 4 and the announcer was Colin Bryce, an announcer on the World’s Strongest Man as well as a past competitor.

Competitors

There were also a number of competitors who had been advertised as entrants but for a variety of reasons had to pull out:

Heat 1
The competitors in the first heat were:

Chuprynin and Wenta dominated. Johannes Arsjo, in his first appearance in a highland event won the whisky plunder (a 320-kg barrel carry) in a time of 14.28 seconds and overcame heavier and more experienced competitors to win the wrestling bouts.

Heat 2
The competitors in the second heat were:

Scott Rider was the overall winner, with winning throws in the stone putt and caber. David Barron winning the sheaf pitch and Sean Betz won the hammer with a throw of 139' 8½”.

Final
Sean Betz won both the hammer and 28-lb weight for distance. Zijlstra won the Famous Grouse Challenge Caber and Arsjo beat Rider in the pole push. The 56-lb weight for height saw no-one reach 17' and was a three-way tie for first place between Arsjo, Wenta and Zijlstra. Going into the final event of the Pictish Stone Carry, Wenta had a 3-point lead over his closest challenger, Rider, but retained his title with by gaining a third place behind Edmunds and Arsjo.

The final placings were:

2009 Event
The 2009 finals were on 14 and 15 July 2009 at Glenarm Castle. The event was sponsored by Met-Rx. The event was overseen by the Earl of Antrim, who gave away The Devastator trophy.

2011 event
The finals of the 2011 Highlander Challenge took place on 17 & 18 June 2011 at Glenarm Castle in Northern Ireland.

References

Highland games
Strongmen competitions
Multi-sport events in the United Kingdom
Sports festivals in Ireland
Highland games in Scotland